
Schwarzsee (literally "Black Lake") is a lake at Blatten in the Lötschental valley in the canton of Valais, Switzerland.

Lakes of Valais